State Route 289 (SR 289) is a  east–west state highway in the northeastern quadrant of the U.S. state of Ohio. The western terminus of SR 289 is at a diamond interchange with U.S. Route 422 (US 422) and SR 193 in Youngstown. Continuing east into Pennsylvania after SR 289 ends is locally-maintained Graham Road.

Route description
SR 289 runs entirely within the northeastern quadrant of Mahoning County.  No portion of this highway is included as a part of the National Highway System (NHS).  The NHS is a network of highways identified as being most important for the economy, mobility and defense of the nation.

History
The SR 289 designation was applied in 1950.  Originally, the highway was routed from the intersection with Wick Avenue, at the time a part of US 62/SR 7, and running southeasterly along its present alignment to its eastern terminus at the Pennsylvania state line just southeast of Lowellville.  Prior to 1950, SR 289 was designated as the easternmost segment of SR 18.

By 1971, when the freeway carrying SR 193 and US 422 between Interstate 680 (I-680) and US 62/SR 7 in Youngstown was opened, the resulting re-routing of US 422 onto the freeway led to the extension of SR 289 along the former path of US 422 along Rayen Avenue and Federal Street to its present western terminus at the interchange with US 422 and SR 193.

Major intersections

References

289
Transportation in Mahoning County, Ohio